Jennifer Niven is a New York Times and international best selling American author who is best known for the 2015 young adult book, All the Bright Places.

Life and career

Niven grew up in Indiana. As well as writing novels, Niven has also worked as a screenwriter, journalist and an associate producer at ABC Television.

Her first two books were non-fiction narratives called The Ice Master (published in 2000) and Ada Blackjack: A True Story of Survival in the Arctic (published in 2003). In 2010, she published a memoir of her years in high school called The Aqua Net Diaries: Big Hair, Big Dreams, Small Town.

She began writing a series of historical novels in 2009. The first, Velva Jean Learns to Drive, was based on a short film of the same name that she had made. It won an Emmy Award and the Colin Higgins Award for Screenwriting. The series also includes, Velva Jean Learns to Fly, Becoming Clementine and American Blonde.

Niven's first young adult novel, All the Bright Places was released in 2015. The narrative follows two teenagers, Violet and Finch who are struggling with mental health issues. It won a 2015 Goodreads choice award for Best Young Adult Fiction and was longlisted for the 2015 Guardian Children's Fiction Prize. It has been adapted into a film by Netflix and stars Elle Fanning, Justice Smith, Keegan-Michael Key, Alexandra Shipp, and Luke Wilson. Production on the film began in October 2018 and it was released on 28 February 2020.

She released another bestselling young adult novel in 2016 called Holding Up the Universe, and her third young adult novel, Breathless, was released in September, 2020.

Bibliography

Young Adult
All the Bright Places (2015) 
Holding Up the Universe (2016) 
Breathless (2020)
Take Me With You When You Go with David Levithan (2021)

Velva Jean Series
Velva Jean Learns to Drive (2009) 
Velva Jean Learns to Fly (2011) 
Becoming Clementine (2012) 
American Blonde (2014) 

Non-fiction
The Ice Master (2000) 
Ada Blackjack: A True Story of Survival in the Arctic (2003) 
The Aqua Net Diaries: Big Hair, Big Dreams, Small Town (2010) 
 Ada Blackjack, survivante de l'Arctique, éditions Paulsen, 2019

References

Living people
American women novelists
21st-century American novelists
21st-century American women writers
Novelists from Indiana
American young adult novelists
Women writers of young adult literature
American women screenwriters
Screenwriters from Indiana
21st-century American screenwriters
Year of birth missing (living people)